Imbricaria flammea is a species of sea snail, a marine gastropod mollusk in the family Mitridae, the miters or miter snails.

Description
The shell size varies between 10 mm and 34 mm

Distribution
This species is distributed in the Red Sea and in the Indian Ocean along Madagascar and Mauritius; Indo-West Pacific.

References

 Dautzenberg, P. (1923). Liste preliminaire des mollusques marins de Madagascar et description de deux especes nouvelles. Journal de Conchyliologie 68: 21–74
 Dautzenberg, Ph. (1929). Mollusques testacés marins de Madagascar. Faune des Colonies Francaises, Tome III
 Vine, P. (1986). Red Sea Invertebrates. Immel Publishing, London. 224 pp.
 Cernohorsky W. O. (1991). The Mitridae of the world (Part 2). Monographs of Marine Mollusca 4. page(s): 52

External links
 Gastropods.com : Ziba flammea; accessed : 13 December 2010

Mitridae
Gastropods described in 1833